The Diass Power Station is a  solar power plant in Senegal. The power station was commissioned on 22 May 2022 by the President of Senegal Macky Sall and his guest Olaf Scholz, the Chancellor of Germany. The solar farm is owned and operated by Société nationale d'électricité du Sénégal (Senelec), the national public electricity utility parastatal company. The power station was constructed with loan financing from the German Development Bank. Senelec integrates the energy from this renewable energy source into the Senegalese national electricity grid.

Location
The power station is located on a  piece of land in the settlement of Diass (also Ndiass), in M'bour Department, in the Thiès Region of Senegal. The geographical coordinates of the Diass Solar Farm are:14°39'10.0"N, 17°06'11.0"W (Latitude:14.652778; Longitude:-17.103056).

Overview
In May 2022, Senegal's installed generation capacity was reported as 1,555 MW. At that time, the majority of electricity sources were from non-renewable fossil-fuel, with solar accounting for only 112 MW. This power station is part of the national plan to diversify the country's generation mix.

The solar park comprises 85,248 photovoltaic modules, eight inverters and sixteen transformers. High voltage transmission wires transmit the energy to a Senelec substation in Kael, where the energy is integrated into the national grid.

Funding
The power station is reported to have cost €20 million to construct. KfW of Germany loaned a portion of that total to the government of Senegal.

See also

 List of power stations in Senegal
 Niakhar Solar Power Station

References

External links
 Official Website of Senelec

Solar power stations in Senegal
Thiès Region
2022 establishments in Senegal
Energy infrastructure completed in 2022